FRED is a comic barbershop quartet formed in 1990 by members of the Marietta Big Chicken Chorus.

Despite their focus on comedy, FRED produces a very refined sound. Their performance in 1999 at the SPEBSQSA International Championship made them gold medalists, making them the first comedy quartet ever to win first place at the International level.

FRED's take on the "comedy quartet" was original, in that they have not relied on spoken dialog in between songs to set up the humor in the next song, as most comedy quartets do.  Instead, their humor is built into their lyrics, musical arrangements, and stage presentation.  Parodies are a staple of their performances, and their parodies (well-known songs set to different words) often have Barbershop "in-jokes" where they poke fun at other quartets and singers, themselves, and even the contest judges.

SPEBSQSA International competition results
FRED has achieved the following results at SPEBSQSA International competitions:

1991: 35th place
1992: 26th place
1993: 27th place
1994: 11th place
1995: 8th place
1996: 4th place
1997: 2nd place (silver medal)
1998: 4th place
1999: 1st place (gold medal)

Discography
 Simply FRED (CD; 1993)
 Get Happy (CD; 1998)
 Putting the HA in HArmony (double-CD; 2000)
 The FreDinci Code (CD; 2006)

External links
 AIC entry

American comedy musical groups
Barbershop Harmony Society
Barbershop quartets
Musical groups established in 1990
Professional a cappella groups